Tore Dyveke Segelcke (23 April 1901 – 22 September 1979) was a Norwegian actress.

Biography
Tore Løkkeberg was born at Fredrikstad in Østfold, Norway. Her parents were Georg Løkkeberg (1872–1951) and Hulda Marie Hansen (1878–1941). She was the sister of  actor Georg Løkkeberg (1909–1986).

She made her debut in 1921 touring with Det Norske Teatret where she was based until 1924. From then on she worked with Det Frie Teater, and then joined the Den Nationale Scene. In 1928 she went to Nationaltheatret, where she stayed until 1972, apart from two years (1933-35) at Det Nye Teater. In her time, she was one of Nationaltheatret's leading actresses in both classical and modern dramatics. She took a total of 104 roles at Nationaltheateret.  In the 1950s, Segelcke shaped her own Individual Theatre. In 1954, she went to many European cities. including Copenhagen, Paris  and Vienna, with her "One Woman Show", with extracts from  Bergliot by Bjørnstjerne Bjørnson  Medea by Jean Anouilh and Din stemme by Jean Cocteau. It was a great success, and she toured the US in 1956 and 1958.

Personal life
She was married from 1927–42 to her colleague  Lasse Segelcke (1898–1942)  and from 1945–1959 to  surgeon  Anton Raabe (1889–1959). During  her marriage to Anton Raabe, they bought and restored a number of  old houses and buildings:  Bjørnsgård  on Lake Bogstadvannet in Oslo (1930-1955); Uppigard Streitlien (today  Folldal bygdetun) in Folldal from 1942 to 1957; and  Huldreheimen  in Bykle. From 1959 onwards, she spent many summers in Folldal.

References

Other sources
Segelcke, Tore. Med luft under vingene. Aschehoug, 1959
Rønneberg, Anton. Skuespillerinnen Tore Segelcke. Aschehoug, 1946
Jonsmoen, Ola. «Hos Tore Segelcke på Uppigard Streitlien i Folldal» I: Årbok for Glåmdalen 1973

External links

museumsnett.no About Folldal bygdetun, with full biography
bjornsgard.no About Bjørnsgård

Norwegian stage actresses
People from Fredrikstad
People from Folldal
1901 births
1979 deaths
20th-century Norwegian actresses